Ptochoryctis is a moth genus in the subfamily Autostichinae.

Species
 Ptochoryctis acrosticta Meyrick, 1906
 Ptochoryctis alma (Meyrick, 1908)
 Ptochoryctis anguillaris Meyrick, 1914
 Ptochoryctis chalazopa Meyrick, 1920
 Ptochoryctis eremopa Meyrick, 1894
 Ptochoryctis galbanea (Meyrick, 1914)
 Ptochoryctis inviolata Meyrick, 1925
 Ptochoryctis ochrograpta Meyrick, 1923
 Ptochoryctis perigramma Meyrick, 1926
 Ptochoryctis scionota Meyrick, 1906
 Ptochoryctis simbleuta Meyrick, 1907

References

 
Autostichinae
Moth genera